Dikaka or Cham, is one of the Savanna languages of Middle Belt, Nigeria. It is also known as Dijim–Bwilim, after its two dialects, Dijim and Bwilim. A tonal language, it has a whistled register. It is spoken in Gombe and southwestern parts of Adamawa State of Nigeria.

Dialects
The two dialects are Dijim and Bwilim.

Dijim [dijím], spoken in and around Kindiyo (currently Cham town)
Bwilim [bwilím], spoken in and around Mɔna (Mwona, Mwana)

Another related dialect is spoken by former speakers of the Jalaa language in and around Loojaa settlement.

Orthography
It consists of 8 vowels and 17 consonants. 
The vowels are: a, e, i, o, u, ǝ, ɨ, ʊ
The consonants are: b, c, d, f, g, h, j, k, l, m, n, p, r, s, t, w, y

References

Waja languages
Languages of Nigeria